Agardhaksla is a peak in Sabine Land at Spitsbergen, Svalbard. It is a part of the mountain Agardhfjellet at the western side of Storfjorden, east of Myklegardfjellet. The peak is named after botanist Jacob Georg Agardh.

References

Mountains of Spitsbergen